Mount Davis is a mountain located in Coos County, New Hampshire. The mountain is located along Montalban Ridge, a series of summits extending south from Mount Washington in the White Mountains.

Mount Davis is named after the Davis family of Massachusetts, a political dynasty whose members, over 220 years, have held at least 20 federal and state elected offices throughout New England.

See also

 List of mountains in New Hampshire
 White Mountain National Forest

References

Mountains of New Hampshire
White Mountains (New Hampshire)
Mountains of Coös County, New Hampshire